GlaxoSmithKline Services Unlimited v Commission (2009) C-513/06 is an EU competition law case, concerning the meaning of harm to "competition" under TFEU article 101.

Facts
GlaxoSmithKline put a clause in contracts with Spanish wholesalers requiring they did not export medicines to other Member States.  National health authorities fix prices for medicines at different levels, and it wished to prevent wholesalers shipping cheap drugs from Spain to the UK. The Commission found that GSK's agreement had the object of restricting competition, given that the agreement served to partition the internal market. GSK appealed against the finding.

Judgment

General Court
The General Court held that the prevention of parallel trade was not enough to amount to a restriction of competition. It said that the objective of article 101 is to stop ‘reducing the welfare of the final consumer of the products in question.' The Commission must not only find a reduction of parallel trade, but also say why this damages competition.

Court of Justice
The Court of Justice overturned the General Court, and held that prevention of parallel imports was unlawful. The General Court had committed an error of law by holding that some effect on consumers was necessary. The unlawfulness of this activity had been established in Consten and Grundig. The Court said the following.

See also

EU competition law

Notes

References

European Union competition case law
2009 in the European Union
2009 in case law
GSK plc litigation